Leishmania mexicana belongs to the Leishmania genus and is the causal agent of cutaneous leishmaniasis in Mexico and central America.

Leishmania mexicana is an obligate intracellular protozoan parasite that causes the cutaneous form of leishmaniasis. This species of Leishmania is found in America. The infection with L. mexicana occurs when an individual is bitten by an infected sandfly that injects infective promastigotes, which are carried in the salivary glands and expulsed by the proboscis, directly to the skin.

The life cycle of this and other Leishmania species begin when an infected Phlebotomine bites and injects promastigotes in the skin of the mammal host. Those promastigotes are engulfed by phagocytic cells, as macrophages and dendritic cells. The parasites are kept inside in a parasitophorous vacuole, then they will transform to amastigotes and divide until brock the cell membrane. They are released to infect new cells as amastigotes stage. When an uninfected sand fly bites an infected mammal reservoir, the sandfly ingests the amastigotes, therefore they transform in promastigotes and divide in the midgut of the fly, those promastigotes migrates to the proboscis and are able to produce Leishmaniasis disease.  There are no blood stages in the life cycle of L. mexicana (unlike Malaria and Trypanosomiasis).

Leishmania mexicana can induce the cutaneous and diffuse cutaneous clinical manifestations in humans. The cutaneous type develops an ulcer at the bite site, here the amastigotes do not spread and the ulcers become visible either a few days or several months after the initial bite. The diffuse cutaneous type begins when the amastigote diffuses through the skin and metastasize to other tissue. This type does not produce ulcers and there is no treatment.

Treatment of Leishmaniasis caused by L. mexicana consists on pentavalent antimonials as Pentostam or Glucantime injected direct into the ulcer or Intramuscular.

Prevention of L. mexicana infection is principally avoiding the bite of the infected sandfly.

References

Parasitic excavates
Trypanosomatida